Last to Go Home is the first solo album by Jason C. Miller. It was released on October 27, 2009 by Count Mecha Music.

Track listing
 "Last to Go Home" – 3:55
 "Drag Me Down" – 3:14
 "Kill That Man" – 4:01
 "Someone Else's Reason" – 3:49
 "The Devil" – 3:34

Personnel
 Jason C. Miller – vocals, rhythm guitar, producer, engineering
 Tina Guo - cello
 Brenda Lee Eager – backing vocals
 Marty O'Brien – bass
 Jamison Boaz – drums, organ, piano, engineering, mixing
 Shane Gibson - guitar
 Paul Gargano - management
 Mark Abbatista - legal
 Diana Knudsen - photography
 Elias Saba - graphic design
 Paul Butterfield - photography
 Mister Sam - art
 Ullrich Hepperlin - layout design

2009 albums
Jason C. Miller albums